Alsin is a protein that in humans is encoded by the ALS2 gene. ALS2 orthologs have been identified in all mammals for which complete genome data are available.

See also
 Juvenile primary lateral sclerosis
 Amyotrophic lateral sclerosis

References

Further reading

External links
 GeneReviews/NCBI/NIH/UW entry on ALS2-Related Disorders
  OMIM entries on ALS2-Related Disorders
  Genetics Home Reference- US National Library of Medicine®